George Hodge  (1878–1953) was an Australian-born cricketer who played one match of first-class cricket for Wellington during the 1907-08 New Zealand cricket season.

Hodge was born in Clunes, Victoria, Australia and died in Parkville, Victoria, Australia.

External links 
  from Cricinfo.
  from CricketArchive.

1878 births
1953 deaths
Australian expatriate sportspeople in New Zealand
New Zealand cricketers
Wellington cricketers
People from Clunes, Victoria
Australian cricketers
Cricketers from Victoria (Australia)
Wicket-keepers